Norte 45 is a station on Line 6 of the Mexico City Metro. It is located in the Colonia Pueblo Salinas neighborhood.

The logo for this station is a compass rose and the station takes its name from a nearby street that runs from northeast to southwest (somewhat unusual for streets in Mexico City that typically run either north–south or east–west). The station opened on 21 December 1983.

From 23 April to 16 June 2020, the station was temporarily closed due to the COVID-19 pandemic in Mexico.

Ridership

References

External links
 

Norte 45
Railway stations opened in 1983
1983 establishments in Mexico
Mexico City Metro stations in Azcapotzalco